Schoeneoplectus californicus is a species of sedge known by the common names California bulrush, southern bulrush and giant bulrush. It is also sometimes called "tule", but the closely related Schoenoplectus acutus is the species most often referred to by that name.

Description
Schoenoplectus californicus is a rhizomed water plant found in marshy areas. It is native to the southern and western United States as well as Mexico, Central America, South America, Easter Island, and the Falkland Islands. It is naturalized on some Pacific islands including New Zealand, Hawaii and the Cook Islands. It has tall, thin, dark green stems which are usually triangular in cross-section and woolly, bristly tan or brown flowers in panicle inflorescences.

Uses 
A notable subspecies is the totora, Schoenoplectus californicus subsp. tatora. This is famous for making up the floating islands on which the Uros people of Lake Titicaca dwell, as well as occurring on isolated Easter Island in the Pacific. 

Boats have also been made from this plant by many cultures, including the Caballito de totora in Peru for over 3,000 years. The plants are still farmed in wetlands next to the sea for the boats, and there is also an ecological reserve that specifically protects these sedge farms called the Swamps of Huanchaco.

References

External links 
 USDA Plants Profile
 Jepson Manual Treatment
 Photos

californicus
Freshwater plants
Flora of the United States
Flora of Mexico
Flora of Central America
Flora of South America
Flora of Easter Island
Flora of the Falkland Islands
Plants described in 1830